Jia Dandan (born 5 May 1982) is a Chinese retired ice hockey goaltender. She represented China in the women's ice hockey tournament at the 2010 Winter Olympics.

References

External links 
 
 
 
 
 
 

1982 births
Living people
Chinese women's ice hockey goaltenders
Sportspeople from Harbin
Ice hockey players at the 2010 Winter Olympics
Olympic ice hockey players of China
Asian Games bronze medalists for China
Medalists at the 2003 Asian Winter Games
Ice hockey players at the 2003 Asian Winter Games
Asian Games medalists in ice hockey